The 2015 IIHF Challenge Cup of Asia became the 8th IIHF Challenge Cup of Asia, an annual international ice hockey tournament held by the International Ice Hockey Federation (IIHF). It took place between 14 and 19 March 2015 in Taipei, Taiwan.

Top Division

Preliminary round

Division I

The Division I competition will played between 18 and 25 April 2015 in Kuwait City, Kuwait.

Preliminary round

See also
 List of sporting events in Taiwan

References

External links
International Ice Hockey Federation

IIHF Challenge Cup of Asia
IIHF Challenge Cups of Asia
International ice hockey competitions hosted by Taiwan